Bucherovskaya is a rural locality (a village) in Yavengskoye Rural Settlement, Vozhegodsky District, Vologda Oblast, Russia. The population was 23 as of 2002.

Geography 
Bucherovskaya is located 31 km northeast of Vozhega (the district's administrative centre) by road. Semenovskaya is the nearest rural locality.

References 

Rural localities in Vozhegodsky District